Deon McCaulay (born 20 September 1987) is a Belizean international footballer who plays as a forward for Atletico Atlanta of the United Premier Soccer League, the Rome Gladiators of the National Indoor Soccer League, and the Belize national team.

Club career
McCaulay has played in Belize for Kremandala, FC Belize and Belize Defence Force; in Costa Rica he had a trial with Puntarenas; he played in Honduras for Deportes Savio from 2009-2011. He has also played for Belmopan Bandits in the Premier League of Belize.

In February 2013 he had a trial with the Portland Timbers of Major League Soccer.

In March 2014 he joined the Atlanta Silverbacks of North American Soccer League.

After a two-year spell back in Belize with Verdes FC, McCaulay rejoined the Atlanta Silverbacks in March 2017.

In April 2018, he signed with the Georgia Revolution FC of the National Premier Soccer League.

In November 2020 he signed for Ginga Atlanta. McCaulay was recognized as UPSL national player of the week on November 27, 2020, and on February 5, 2021

International career
McCaulay made his international debut for Belize in 2007. He was a member of Belize's FIFA World Cup qualifying campaign for the 2010, 2014 and 2018 editions, and he scored the first goal and first hat-trick of the 2014 FIFA World Cup qualifying campaign.  He is Belize's all-time top scorer, with eighteen goals in FIFA World Cup qualifying, as well as two goals at the 2007 UNCAF Nations Cup and one goal at the 2013 Copa Centroamericana. He was also the worldwide top goalscorer in 2014 FIFA World Cup qualification along with Luis Suárez and Robin van Persie with eleven goals. He scored a hat-trick of those eleven in a 5–2 rout of Montserrat in June 2011.

International career statistics

International goals
Scores and results list Belize's goal tally first.

References

External links
Silverbacks profile

1987 births
Living people
People from Belize City
Association football forwards
Belizean footballers
Belize international footballers
2007 UNCAF Nations Cup players
2011 Copa Centroamericana players
2013 Copa Centroamericana players
2013 CONCACAF Gold Cup players
2014 Copa Centroamericana players
2017 Copa Centroamericana players
Puntarenas F.C. players
Deportes Savio players
Atlanta Silverbacks players
Belizean expatriate footballers
Expatriate footballers in Costa Rica
Expatriate footballers in Honduras
Expatriate soccer players in the United States
Liga Nacional de Fútbol Profesional de Honduras players
Premier League of Belize players
North American Soccer League players
Georgia Revolution FC players
Belmopan Bandits players
FC Belize players
Verdes FC players
Belize Defence Force FC players
R.G. City Boys United players
Kremandala players
United Premier Soccer League players